Epibacterium ulvae is a Gram-negative, rod-shaped and motile bacterium from the genus of Epibacterium. It has been isolated from the alga Ulva australis from Clovelly in Australia.

References 

Rhodobacteraceae
Bacteria described in 2013